South is an English surname. Notable people with the surname include:

 George South (born 1962), American professional wrestler
 Harry South (1929–1990), British composer
 Sir James South (1785–1867), British astronomer
 Joe South (1940–2012), American singer-songwriter
 Melanie South (born 1986), British tennis player
 Robert South (1634–1716), English churchman
 Seán South (1929–1957), Irish Republican Army leader

English-language surnames